William Stewart (September 10, 1810 –   October 17, 1876) was a Republican member of the U.S. House of Representatives from Pennsylvania.

William Stewart was born in Mercer, Pennsylvania. He attended the public schools and graduated from Jefferson College in Canonsburg, Pennsylvania. He studied law, was admitted to the bar and commenced practice in Mercer. He was a member of the Pennsylvania State Senate.

Stewart was elected as a Republican to the Thirty-fifth and Thirty-sixth Congresses. He was the chairman of the United States House Committee on Expenditures in the Department of War during the Thirty-sixth Congress. He resumed the practice of law, and died in Mercer in 1876, aged 66. Interred in Mercer Cemetery.

Sources

The Political Graveyard

External links 
 

1810 births
1876 deaths
People from Mercer, Pennsylvania
Washington & Jefferson College alumni
Pennsylvania lawyers
Republican Party members of the United States House of Representatives from Pennsylvania
19th-century American politicians
19th-century American lawyers